The North Carolina Black Repertory Company was founded in Winston-Salem, North Carolina in 1979 by Larry Leon Hamlin.  It was the first organization for black theatre in the state.

In addition to producing several productions throughout the year, its most notable program is the National Black Theatre Festival.

Notes

Further reading 

African-American theatre
Theatres in Winston-Salem, North Carolina